Tianchisaurus (meaning "heavenly pool lizard"), also invalidly called Tianchiasaurus and "Jurassosaurus", is a genus of ankylosaurian dinosaur from the Late Jurassic (Oxfordian–Kimmeridgian)-aged Toutunhe Formation of China. If it actually belongs to the family Ankylosauridae as proposed by Dong Zhiming, it would be the second earliest member of that family, being slightly younger than Spicomellus. Unlike other ankylosaurids, it lacked a bony club at the tip of its tail.

Discovery and naming
The holotype (IVPP V. 10614), discovered in 1974, consists of skull fragments, five cervicals, six dorsals, seven sacrals, and three caudals, limb fragments, scutes and some unidentifiable fragments.

The type specimen was informally referred to as "Jurassosaurus" after the 1993 film Jurassic Park, and the species epithet nedegoapeferima is formed from the surnames of the film's main stars: Sam Neill, Laura Dern, Jeff Goldblum, Richard Attenborough, Bob Peck, Martin Ferrero, Ariana Richards, and Joseph Mazzello. Director Steven Spielberg, who has funded Chinese dinosaur research, proposed the name. Dong Zhiming ultimately discarded the genus name "Jurassosaurus" (which is now a nomen nudum) in favor of Tianchisaurus, but retained the species name honoring the actors. The description paper uses the spellings Tianchiasaurus and Tianchisaurus interchangeably, but is spelled with the extra "a" in the section naming it as a new genus. In 1994, Dong published an erratum stating that Tianchisaurus is the correct name.

Sanghongesaurus, described by Zhao Xijin (1983), is sometimes referred to as a basal ornithischian or a synonym of Tianchisaurus.

See also

 Timeline of ankylosaur research

References

Ankylosaurs
Taxa named by Dong Zhiming
Paleontology in Xinjiang
Ornithischian genera